David Khan (1795–1851) was a Persian diplomat, Qajar civil servant, and Royal Physician to the Shah of Persia.

Biography 
Born in Shiraz in 1795, David Khan was active in the diplomatic service of the British government in India for more than twenty years. Later, he returned to Persia where he served as a Qajar government official and Physician to the Shah.

Family 
A member of the Davidkhanian family, Martiros Khan Davidkhanian, Markar Khan Davidkhanian, and other known members of the family share his blood.

References

Qajar civil servants
Iranian diplomats
Iranian physicians
1795 births
1851 deaths
People from Shiraz
Persian Armenians